FC Sayana Haskovo is a Bulgarian football club based in Haskovo, that currently plays in the Third Amateur Football League, the third tier of Bulgarian football. Haskovo's home ground is the Haskovo Stadium, which has a capacity of 9 000 spectators. Founded as Izvor Gorski Izvor in 2012, the team was renamed to Sayana in 2021 and moved to Haskovo.

History

Foundation of Izvor
In 2012 Izvor was founded in Gorski Izvor, Haskovo Province. In 2020 the team was promoted to the Third Amateur Football League. In their first season the team finished on 10th place.

2021–present: Sayana ownership
In 2021, the team was renamed Sayana, under their owner's name, a dairy products company, and was moved to Haskovo. Their first game in the professional football was a away game against Beroe II.

Current squad 
As of 20 November 2021

Managers

Past seasons

References

External links
Club page at bgclubs.eu

Botev Plovdiv
Association football clubs established in 2021
2021 establishments in Bulgaria